Ó Laighin, Gaelic-Irish surname, anglicised as Lyons, Lane or Lyne.

Overview

Ó Laighin was the surname of two unrelated families in medieval Ireland.

1 - Ó Laighin of County Kerry, usually anglicised as Lyne.

2 - Ó Laighin of County Galway, their home district been around Kilconnell. Now rendered Lyons or Lane.

Over two hundred households of the latter family were recorded between 1847-64.

Etymology

Laighin is the Irish name for Leinster, the most populated of the four Provinces of Ireland, which is located in the south-east of the island and entirely within the Republic of Ireland. The prefix Ó (common in Irish surnames) creates the meaning "of Leinster" or "descendant of Leinster".

Laighin may also derive from the Irish word láigen, meaning 'spear' or 'lance', which lent its name to the Laigin (Leinstermen) who inhabited pre-Norman south-east Ireland.

Notable People

 Pádraig B. Ó Laighin, academic in sociology, poet and advocate for the Irish language.

See also

 Donal Lyons, Mayor of Galway, 2001–2002.
 Mossie Lyons, Kerry footballer.
 Tadhg Lyne, Kerry footballer, c. 1933 – May 31, 2002.
 Hugh Lane, Irish art enthusiast, 1875 - 1915.

References

Surnames
Irish families
Surnames of Irish origin
Irish-language surnames
Families of Irish ancestry